Ong Ye Kung (born 15 November 1969) is a Singaporean politician and former civil servant who has been serving as Minister for Health since 2021. A member of the governing People's Action Party (PAP), he has been the Member of Parliament (MP) representing the Sembawang Central division of Sembawang GRC since 2015. 

Prior to entering politics, Ong worked in the Ministry of Communications, Ministry of Trade and Industry, Singapore Workforce Development Agency, National Trades Union Congress and Keppel Corporation. He was also the principal private secretary to Deputy Prime Minister Lee Hsien Loong between 2002 and 2004.

He made his political debut in the 2011 general election as part of a five-member PAP team contesting in Aljunied GRC but lost to the Worker's Party where the PAP team obtained 45.28% of the valid votes. He contested again in the 2015 general election as part of a five-member PAP team contesting in Sembawang GRC and won where the PAP team obtained 72.28% of the valid votes.

Before becoming Minister for Health, he was Minister for Education between 2015 and 2020, serving alongside Ng Chee Meng between 2015 and 2018, and Minister for Transport between 2020 and 2021. From 2020 to 2021, he is also a co-chair of the Multi-Ministry Taskforce set up by the government to manage Singapore's handling response to the COVID-19 pandemic.

Education 
Ong attended Maris Stella High School and Raffles Junior College before graduating from the London School of Economics in 1991 with a Bachelor of Science degree in economics.

In 1999, he completed a Master of Business Administration degree at the International Institute for Management Development in Lausanne, Switzerland.

Career

Civil Service career
Ong started his career working in the Ministry of Communications between 1993 and 1999. He served as Director of Trade in the Ministry of Trade and Industry between 2000 and 2003 and was the Deputy Chief Negotiator for the Singapore–United States Free Trade Agreement signed in May 2003. He was Principal Private Secretary to Deputy Prime Minister Lee Hsien Loong between 2002 and 2004. Ong also served as the chief executive officer of the Workforce Development Agency between 2005 and 2008. Following that, he joined the National Trades Union Congress as Assistant Secretary-General.

Political career 
In the 2011 general election, Ong contested in Aljunied GRC as part of a five-member People's Action Party (PAP) team led by George Yeo. The PAP team lost to the Workers' Party team led by Low Thia Khiang. This was the first time in Singapore's history when the PAP lost a GRC in an election.

Following the 2011 general election, Ong continued to work at the National Trades Union Congress (NTUC) and became Deputy Secretary-General in June 2011. He was also elected into the NTUC's Central Committee later that year. In 2013, he left the NTUC and became Director of Group Strategy at Keppel Corporation.

In the 2015 general election, Ong joined as part of the five-member PAP team contesting in Sembawang GRC, which was considered 'safer' for him. The PAP team won with 72% of the vote and Ong was elected as the Member of Parliament representing the Gambas ward of Sembawang GRC.

On 1 October 2015, Ong was appointed Senior Minister of State for Defence and Acting Minister for Education (Higher Education and Skills). On 1 November 2016, he was promoted to Second Minister for Defence while concurrently holding the portfolio of Minister for Education (Higher Education and Skills) alongside Ng Chee Meng, who was Minister for Education (Schools). In 2017, Ong moved a Bill in Parliament to confer the Singapore University of Social Sciences autonomous status.

On 1 May 2018, the two Education portfolios were merged into a single one; Ong took over the single portfolio as Minister for Education, Ong had also relinquished his Second Minister of Defence portfolio at the same time.

On 27 July 2020, Ong relinquished his portfolio as Minister for Education and succeeded Khaw Boon Wan as Minister for Transport, as well as the Anchor Minister of Sembawang GRC.

In the lead-up to the 2020 general election, Ong was widely seen as one of the three leading candidates (alongside Heng Swee Keat and Chan Chun Sing) to succeed Lee Hsien Loong as Prime Minister of Singapore. Ong led the PAP team in Sembawang GRC and they won with about 67% of the vote. Ong's former Gambas ward was merged with part of Khaw Boon Wan's former Sembawang ward,  forming the new Sembawang Central ward which is currently helmed by Ong.

On 23 April 2021, Ong was appointed co-chair of the multi-ministerial committee formed on 22 January 2020 to manage the COVID-19 pandemic in Singapore. Following a Cabinet reshuffle on 15 May 2021, Ong relinquished his portfolio as Minister for Transport and succeeded Gan Kim Yong as Minister for Health.

Ong was considered by many to be one of the most likely candidates to succeed Heng Swee Keat as leader of the fourth-generation (4G) team, however it was ultimately revealed that Finance Minister Lawrence Wong had the most support compared to the other candidates.

Ong has spoke out on the events of Anti-Indian sentiment at Singapore.

Other appointments
 Board Member, Monetary Authority of Singapore (29 Aug 2016 – 31 May 2019)
 Board Member, SMRT Corporation (2006–2014) As an independent director, he was appointed to head an internal investigation into the major train disruptions between 15 and 17 December 2011.
 Chairman, Employment and Employability Institute
 Adviser, National Transport Workers' Union (NTWU), Singapore Industrial and Services Employees’ Union (SISEU), and Attractions, Resorts & Entertainment Union (AREU)
 Executive Secretary, National Transport Workers' Union and the Singapore Manual and Mercantile Workers' Union.

Personal life
Ong's father, Ong Lian Teng, was a Barisan Sosialis politician who was a Member of the Legislative Assembly for Bukit Panjang SMC from 22 October 1963 to 8 August 1965 and then as Member of Parliament from 9 August 1965 till 5 December 1966, when he resigned to protest the "undemocratic acts" of the PAP government. In an interview with The Straits Times in 2011, Ong noted that his father (who died in 2009) had been fully supportive of his decision to become involved in politics as a member of the PAP despite his own past involvement in opposition politics in Singapore.

Ong is married to Diana Kuik Sin Leng, the daughter of real estate magnate Kuik Ah Han. They have two daughters.

Ong's maternal cousin, Xie Yao Quan, is also a PAP Member of Parliament representing the Jurong Central ward of Jurong GRC.

References

External links

 Ong Ye Kung on Prime Minister's Office
 Ong Ye Kung on Parliament of Singapore
 

People's Action Party politicians
Alumni of the London School of Economics
Singaporean people of Hokkien descent
Living people
1969 births
Ministers for Transport of Singapore
Ministers for Education of Singapore
Singaporean trade unionists
Raffles Junior College alumni
Members of the Parliament of Singapore
Members of the Cabinet of Singapore